A drum beat or drum pattern is a rhythmic pattern, or repeated rhythm establishing the meter and groove through the pulse and subdivision, played on drum kits and other percussion instruments. As such a "beat" consists of multiple drum strokes occurring over multiple musical beats while the term "drum beat" may also refer to a single drum stroke which may occupy more or less time than the current pulse. Many drum beats define or are characteristic of specific music genres.

Many basic drum beats establish the pulse through alternating bass (on the on-beats) and snare drums (on the off-beats) strokes while establishing the subdivision on the ride cymbal (thus its name) or hi-hat:

This establishes a quarter note pulse in (quad)duple time: each measure is formed from (two groups of) two quarter note pulses, each pulse divided into two eighth notes.

This establishes a quarter note pulse in triple time: each measure is formed from three quarter note pulses, each divided into two eighth notes.

This establishes a dotted-quarter note pulse in duple time: each measure is formed from two dotted-quarter note pulses, each pulse divided into three eighth notes.

Compound triple meter is equivalent to simple duple meter with triplets on every beat.

This establishes a dotted-quarter note pulse in triple time: each measure is formed from three dotted-quarter note pulses, each pulse divided into three eighth notes.

A "fill" is played in between the regular strokes of a pattern and/or signals the end of a phrase:

Since a phrase is multiple measures long, a fill signaling the end of one would come at the end of the last in a series of repeated measures.

In double and half-time patterns the pulse and ride are either doubled or halved, respectively, occurring twice or half as often:

A blast beat drum pattern features all drums on the eighth note subdivision or variants with one or more drum's pattern displaced by a sixteenth note:

This resembles a combination of double-time (bass-snare pattern) and original time (ride pattern).

Despite the difference in notation, there is no difference in interonset intervals and this pattern is nearly identical to the first simple duple pattern except for the second onbeat being divided into two eighth notes and the second backbeat being delayed an eighth note.

The heavy metal gallop, named for a horse's canter, is based on a bass drum pattern of one eighth followed by two sixteenths.

See also
Break (music)
Drum cadence
Ghost note
Rhythm section
Riddim
Rosanna shuffle
Purdie shuffle
Bo Diddley beat

Sources

Drum patterns